Medicarpin is a pterocarpan, a derivative of isoflavonoids.

Natural occurrences 
Medicarpin is found in Medicago truncatula and Swartzia madagascariensis. It can also be found in Maackia amurensis cell cultures.

The root nodule formation by Sinorhizobium meliloti is apparently dependent on the flavonoids pathway.

Metabolism 
Pterocarpin synthase has 3 substrates : medicarpin, NADP+ and H2O, and 3 products : vestitone, NADPH and H+.

References 

Pterocarpans